The First League of Serbia and Montenegro was the top football league of Serbia and Montenegro, before the country's dissolution in 2006. The league was formed following the breakup of Yugoslavia in 1992, effectively succeeding the Yugoslav First League. The league was renamed the Serbia and Montenegro SuperLiga prior to its final 2005–06 season.

From 1993 to 1998, the league abandoned the traditional single-league structure, which was used in the first season, and the division was split into two groups; Group A (known as IA) for the top-seeded teams and Group B (IB) for the other teams. Until 1995–96, the bottom four teams of the IA group were replaced with the top four teams of IB after the first half of the season, once all teams have played each other in their respective group twice.  From 1996–97, the system of replacing teams in each group mid-season was scrapped and was only applied at the end of the season.  As a consequence, all teams in each group played each other three times a season, playing each other once at home and once away at least.  This two-group format was abandoned after the 1997–98 season and the league reverted to the single-league structure.

The republics of Serbia and Montenegro remained united as the Federal Republic of Yugoslavia, political reform in the country saw it renamed to Serbia and Montenegro in 2003.  After Montenegro gained independence in June 2006, the league ceased to exist and has been succeeded by the Serbian SuperLiga and the Montenegrin First League.

History
The league just followed the seasons from the Yugoslav First League and for long it didn't even consider itself separated from it. For instance, in 1992 there was no inaugural season, all that happened was that clubs from the republics that proclaimed independence left the league, and their places were replaced by teams from Serbia and Montenegro which were next in line. The organiser, the Football Association of Yugoslavia kept same president and same people in charge of the competition. The same FA was running the Yugoslav national team that qualified for the 1992 UEFA European Championship, however, with the start of the Yugoslav Wars and the responsibility put only on Serbia and Montenegro, it is this two republics, which formed the FR Yugoslavia, that suffered the economic sanctions that banned both national team and clubs, from participating in international competitions. Some clubs such as FK Borac Banja Luka showed solidarity by staying within Yugoslav league system, despite being part of a territory belonging to a republic that declared independence, and got it recognised.

Champions

Seasons

See also
 Yugoslav First League
 Serbian SuperLiga
 Montenegrin First League
 List of Serbian football champions
 List of football clubs in Serbia
 List of football clubs in Montenegro

External links
 Union of First Federal League Clubs - Meridian SuperLiga

 
 

 
Sports leagues established in 1992
Sports leagues disestablished in 2006
Defunct football leagues in Serbia
Defunct football leagues in Montenegro
Football in Serbia and Montenegro
Serb
1992 establishments in Serbia
1992 establishments in Montenegro
2006 disestablishments in Serbia and Montenegro